Canadian Cinema Editors (CCE) is a professional association of film editors, founded in 2007.  The bilingual non-profit organization promotes picture editing in television, film and new media.

2011 CCE Award Winners

2012 C.C.E. Award Winners

2013 C.C.E. Award Winners

2014 C.C.E. Award Winners 
{| class="wikitable mw-collapsible mw-collapsed"
!Category
!Person/People
!Show
|-
|Best Editing in Feature length
|Matthew Hannam
|Enemy
|-
|Best Editing in Television Movie or Mini-Series
|Garth C. Scales, CCE
|What Remains
|-
|Best Editing in Long Form Television Series – (1 hour drama, comedy, family program)
|Stephen Lawrence, CCE
|'Orphan Black, Episode 103
|-
|Best Editing in 1/2 hour Broadcast Short Form
|Jay Prychidny
|The Next Step, Ep 30 Winner
|-
|Best Editing in Documentary
|Mark Ratzlaff
|Blood Relative
|-
|Best Editing in Lifestyle/Reality
|Giorgio Saturnino & Michael Esteves
|Jonathan Toews, Every Picture Tells A Story
|-
|Best Editing in Animation
|Paul Hunter
|The Nut Job
|-
|Best Editing in Short Film
|Erin Deck
|Sunday Punch
|-
|Best Editing in Web Series
|Michael Doherty, CCE
|Darknet, Episode 101
|-
|Lifetime Achievement Award
|Debra Karen
|
|-
|Student Merit Award
|Walter Woodman (Ryerson University)

Ray Savaya (Sheridan College)

Mark Fifield  (Humber College)

Daniel Haack (Ryerson University)

Angelica Falco (Sheridan College)
|Noah

Walk the Moon

Rosbilt

Bridges

Anatomy of a Sunbeam
|}

 2015 C.C.E. Award Winners 

 2016 C.C.E. Award Winners 

 2017 C.C.E. Award Winners 

 EditCon 

2018 - https://cceditors.ca/2018/02/10/editcon-2018/

2019 - https://cceditors.ca/2019/02/02/editcon-2019/

2020 - https://cceditors.ca/2020/02/01/editcon-2020-event/

2021 - https://cceditors.ca/2021/02/23/editcon-2021-event/

2022 - https://cceditors.ca/2022/03/14/editcon-2022-event/

 Membership 

Editors are voted into Full Membership based on the following criteria: the quality of their achievements, their passion to the craft of editing and education of the craft to peers and students.  Full Members must be sponsored by at least 2 current Full Members''. A jury of peers votes on the application, based on a minimum of 60 hours of edited work and overall quality. Successful applicants may use the designation C.C.E. after their name.

Full Members (as of 2017)

 Ricardo Acosta
 Jamie Alain
 Trevor Ambrose
 George Appleby
 Michel Arcand
 Geoff Ashenhurst
 Mike Banas
 Michael John Bateman
 Manfred Becker
 Thorben Bieger
 Lisa Binkley
 James Bredin
 Ralph Brunjes
 Don Cassidy
 Caroline Christie
 Julian Clarke
 Alan Collins
 Richard Comeau
 Chris Cooper
 Jean Coulombe
 Daryl Davis
 Paul Day
 Teresa De Luca
 Pia Di Ciaula
 Michael Doherty
 Christopher Donaldson
 Daria Ellerman
 Ken Filywych
 Ellen Fine
 Eric Goddard
 Roushell Goldstein
 Lisa Grootenboer
 Cathy Gulkin
 Wendy Hallam
 Matthew Hannam
 Teresa Hannigan
 Reginald Harkema
 Nick Hector
 Michèle Hozer
 James Ilecic
 Thomas Joerin
 Roslyn Kalloo
 Debra Karen
 Dave Kazala
 Bert Kish
 Bruce Lange
 Stephen Lawrence
 Allan Lee
 Mike Lee
 Isabelle Malenfant
 Roger Mattiussi
 Lara Mazur
 Gordon McClellan
 Kimberlee McTaggart
 Rik Morden
 Michael Morningstar
 Kelly Morris
 Jane Morrison
 Mike Munn
 Dona Noga
 Werner Nold
 Michael Pacek
 Deborah Palloway
 Stephen Philipson
 Jay Prychidny
 Gordon Rempel
 Charles Robichaud
 Lisa Robison
 George Roulston
 Mark Sanders
 Ron Sanders
 Gary L "Kelly" Smith 
 Mary Stephen
 Brett Sullivan
 Vesna Svilanovic
 David B. Thompson
 Gordon Thorne
 D. Gillian Truster
 Pete Watson
 Craig Webster
 L. Ion Webster
 Steve Weslak
 Greg West
 Ben Wilkinson 
 Mairin Wilkinson
 Paul Winestock
 Ron Wisman Sr

Associate Members must show an interest in the craft of editing and have three professional references.

Student Members must be full-time students.

Educational programs and events 

The CCE offers workshops in conjunction with Centennial College in Toronto, LaSalle College in Vancouver, and Nova Scotia Community College in Halifax.

Recent workshops include Assistant Editing (with James Lawson or Paul Whitehead), Documentary Editing (with Ricardo Acosta, Michèle Hozer, or Kelly Morris), Drama Editing (with Matthew Hannam or Jeanne Slater), Reality Editing (with Jonathan Dowler), and Animation Editing (with Jamie Ebata and Dan Lee).

The CCE regularly holds panel discussions and screenings to educate regarding new post-production issues, and to promote editing as a primary creative force in television and film. Panels have included discussion of the RED camera and how it affects post production, the role of Post Production Supervisor (panelists included Gregor Hutchison, Rachel Sutherland, Adam Roberts, Doug Wilkinson, Julie Lawrence and Gary Mueller), and sound editing. Screenings, followed by questions and answers time with the editor include "Dead Ringers" (editor Ron Sanders, C.C.E.), "Cairo Time" (editor Teresa Hannigan, C.C.E.) and "District 9" (editor Julian Clarke, C.C.E.).

See also
 Directors Guild of Canada

References

External links
 Canadian Cinema Editors

 
 
Film organizations in Canada
Entertainment industry societies